The Danish Touringcar Championship (abbreviated as the DTC) was a touring car racing series in Denmark. The inaugural year for the DTC was 1999, after the huge success in Scandinavia of the British Touring Car Championship. For the first two years it was known as the Danish Touring Car Challenge. The final DTC season was in 2010, as the series merged with the Swedish Touring Car Championship to form the Scandinavian Touring Car Championship.

Champions

References

External links
  (Some news in ).
 Touring Car Times

Touring car racing series
Motorsport competitions in Denmark
1999 establishments in Denmark
2010 disestablishments in Denmark